The British League Knockout Cup 1966 was the 28th edition of the Knockout Cup. Halifax Dukes won the cup and therefore secured the league and cup double.

First round

Second round

Third round

Semi-final

Final (First Leg)

Scorers

Halifax Dukes
 1)  Eric Boothroyd 3 2* 3 3 1 - 12 (1)
 2)  Bob Jameson 1 2 0 2* 1 - 6 (1)
 3)  Dave Younghusband 3 3 3 3 3 - 15*
 4)  Dennis Gavros 2* 2* 3 1 1 - 9 (2)
 5)  Tommy Roper 3 1 2* 2* 3 - 11 (2)
 6)  Eric Boocock 2* 3 3 3 3 - 14 (1)*
 7)  Maury Robinson 1* 1 - 2 (1)

Wimbledon Dons
 1)  Jim Tebby 0 Ef 0 0 2 - 2
 2)  Olle Nygren 2 3 2 2 2 - 11
 3)  Trevor Hedge F 1 2 1 2 - 6
 4)  Reg Luckhurst 1 1* 2 0 0 - 4 (1)
 5)  Bob Dugard 1 1 1 1 0 - 4
 6)  Tony Childs 0 0 0 0 0 - 0
 7)  Peter Jackson F 0 - 0

Heat by Heat
 Ht 01: Boothroyd, Nygren, Jameson, Tebby 69.8
 Ht 02: Younghusband, Gavros, Luckhurst, Hedge (f) 70.0
 Ht 03: Nygren, Jameson, Robinson, Jackson (f) 71.0
 Ht 04: Younghusband, Boothroyd, Hedge, Tebby (ef) 70.4
 Ht 05: Roper, Boocock, Dugard, Childs 71.0 
 Ht 06: Boothroyd, Hedge, Luckhurst, Jameson 70.4
 Ht 07: Younghusband, Gavros, Dugard, Childs 71.2
 Ht 08: Boocock, Nygren, Roper, Tebby 70.2 
 Ht 09: Gavros, Luckhurst, Robinson, Jackson 72.0 
 Ht 10: Boothroyd, Jameson, Dugard, Childs 72.0
 Ht 11: Boocock, Roper, Hedge, Luckhurst 71.0 
 Ht 12: Younghusband, Nygren, Gavros, Tebby 71.4 
 Ht 13: Boocock, Roper, Dugard, Childs 70.8
 Ht 14: Younghusband, Nygren, Boothroyd, Luckhurst 71.0
 Ht 15: Boocock, Hedge, Jameson, Childs 70.0 
 Ht 16: Roper, Tebby, Gavros, Dugard 71.8

Final (Second Leg)

Scorers

Wimbledon Dons
 1)  Olle Nygren 3 3 3 3 3 - 15*
 2)  Jim Tebby 1 3 1 0 1 - 6
 3)  Trevor Hedge 2* 2* 3 3 0 - 10 (2)
 4)  Bob Dugard 3 1 3 1 1* - 9 (1)
 5)  Reg Luckhurst 2 2 2 2 2 - 10
 6)  Tony Childs 0 0 0 N N - 0
 7)  Peter Jackson 0 1 1* 0 - 2 (1)

Halifax Dukes
 1)  Eric Boothroyd 2 0 3 2 3 - 10
 2)  Bob Jameson 0 1* 1 0 1* - 3 (2)
 3)  Dave Younghusband 1 1 2 3 3 - 10
 4)  Dennis Gavros 0 0 2 1 2 - 5
 5)  Tommy Roper 1 0 1* 0 0 - 2 (1)
 6)  Eric Boocock 3 2 2 3 2* - 12 (1)
 7)  Maury Robinson 2 0 - 2

Heat by Heat
 Ht 01: Nygren, Boothroyd, Tebby, Jameson 68.9
 Ht 02: Dugard, Hedge, Younghusband, Gavros 72.4
 Ht 03: Tebby, Robinson, Jameson, Jackson 73.4
 Ht 04: Nygren, Hedge, Younghusband, Boothroyd 71.0
 Ht 05: Boocock, Luckhurst, Roper, Childs 71.1 
 Ht 06: Nygren, Younghusband, Tebby, Gavros 72.1 
 Ht 07: Hedge, Boocock, Dugard, Roper 71.8 
 Ht 08: Boothroyd, Luckhurst, Jameson, Childs 73.2
 Ht 09: Dugard, Gavros, Jackson, Robinson (f rem) 73.2 
 Ht 10: Nygren, Boocock, Roper, Tebby 70.9 
 Ht 11: Younghusband, Luckhurst, Gavros, Childs 71.6
 Ht 12: Hedge, Boothroyd, Dugard, Jameson 72.4 
 Ht 13: Boocock, Luckhurst, Jackson, Roper 73.1
 Ht 14: Nygren, Gavros, Jameson, Hedge 72.8
 Ht 15: Younghusband, Boocock, Tebby, Jackson 72.4 
 Ht 16: Boothroyd, Luckhurst, Dugard, Roper 73.2

See also
1966 British League season
Knockout Cup (speedway)

References

 
Speedway leagues
1966 in British motorsport
1966 in speedway
Speedway competitions in the United Kingdom